The Gown Shop is a 1923 American silent comedy film directed by and starring Larry Semon that featured Oliver Hardy.

Cast
 Larry Semon as Larry, a salesman
 Kathleen Myers as Head saleslady
 Oliver Hardy as Store manager (credited as Babe Hardy)
 Fred DeSilva as Dressmaker (credited as F.F. DeSylva)
 Pete Gordon as Worker
 William Hauber (credited as Bill Hauber)
 Frank Hayes as Wife in audience
 James Donnelly as Husband
 Spencer Bell as Janitor
 Harry DeRoy as Audience member
 Dorothea Wolbert as Audience member
 Otto Lederer as Audience member

See also
 List of American films of 1923
 Oliver Hardy filmography

External links

1923 films
American silent short films
Silent American comedy films
American black-and-white films
1923 comedy films
Films directed by Larry Semon
1923 short films
American comedy short films
1920s American films
1920s English-language films